David McMillan (1836 – 6 July 1904) was a 19th-century Member of Parliament in the Canterbury region of New Zealand.

He came to New Zealand on the Rose of Sharon in 1857 and settled near Southbridge. From 1874, he held various local political roles. He was on the Selwyn County Council from the beginning and chaired the body for 11 years.

He represented the Coleridge electorate from 1881 to 1887, when he retired.

In 1900, he visited his native Scotland. He died on 6 July 1904 and was buried at Ellesmere Cemetery.

References

1836 births
1904 deaths
Members of the New Zealand House of Representatives
New Zealand MPs for South Island electorates
Scottish emigrants to New Zealand
19th-century New Zealand politicians